Law and Human Behavior is a bimonthly academic journal published by the American Psychology–Law Society. It publishes original empirical papers, reviews, and meta-analyses on how the law, legal system, and legal process relate to human behavior, particularly legal psychology and forensic psychology. The current editor-in-chief is Bradley D. McAuliff (California State University, Northridge). Past editors have been Margaret Bull Kovera (John Jay College of Criminal Justice), Brian Cutler (University of Ontario Institute of Technology), Richard Wiener (University of Nebraska), Ronald Roesch (Simon Fraser University), Michael J. Saks (Arizona State University), and Bruce Sales (University of Arizona).

Abstracting and indexing 
The journal is abstracted and indexed by MEDLINE/PubMed and the Social Sciences Citation Index. According to the Journal Citation Reports, the journal has a 2020 impact factor of 3.795.

References

External links 
 

American law journals
Forensic psychology journals
Publications established in 1977
Bimonthly journals
English-language journals
American Psychological Association academic journals